The Amador County Arts Council (ACAC) is the official Amador County, United States, arts council.

A non-profit, local partner of the California Arts Council.

Mission

The Amador County Arts Council's mission is to Support Promote and Encourage the Arts in our Schools and Community.

Programs

ACAC Arts in Education Program
To help local schools maintain the arts as an integral part of their children's curriculum.

External links
Amador County Arts Council website

Arts councils of California
Amador County, California